William L. Trenholm (1836–1901) was a United States Comptroller of the Currency from 1886 to 1889. In 1898, Trenholm (then president of the American Surety Company) was elected president of the North American Trust Company.

Biography
Trenholm attended South Carolina College, where he was a member of the Delta Kappa Epsilon fraternity, graduating in 1855.

Comptroller of the Currency from 1886 to 1889, Trenholm, a Confederate Army veteran, was the first Democrat and first Southerner to be appointed Comptroller. Appointed to office by President Grover Cleveland, he was known for the large number of changes he recommended in the banking laws. Some, such as the provision that banks could change name and location without an act of Congress, were adopted. Other recommendations influenced later legislation, including the Federal Reserve Act of 1913. Trenholm resigned to become president of a large insurance company and later served as president of a trust company.

On January 19, 1898, Trenholm (then president of the American Surety Company) was elected president of the North American Trust Company. In 1899, Trenholm desired to be "free of business cares" and retire, and an election was held for a new president at 100 Broadway. On May 26, 1899, Alvah Trowbridge was elected as the new president of the company, succeeding Trenholm.

See also
 Bank regulation in the United States

References

External links

United States Comptrollers of the Currency
Comptrollers in the United States
1836 births
1901 deaths
North American Trust Company people
Cleveland administration personnel
Benjamin Harrison administration personnel